Storyhunter is the all-in-one creator management platform helping companies manage their creative freelancer workforce. The company is also a marketplace for video production services that matches brands and media companies with content creators using algorithms. Members can use the service to hire, manage, and pay freelance video producers globally.

Overview
Storyhunter, Inc. was founded in 2012 by Jaron Gilinsky in Brooklyn, New York. Alex Ragir joined him as co-founder that same year. Storyhunter has raised more than $4.2m in venture financing from investors. 

Storyhunter has grown from an independent network of video journalists to a technology platform serving Fortune 500 brands, media companies, and freelance content professionals worldwide. 

In 2015, Storyhunter launched unified video production marketplace and creator management platform, which today powers original video and media production globally. Storyhunter’s Creator Management Platform organizes creator teams, messaging, project management, online contracts, and global payments in one central dashboard for the world’s leading media companies and brands.

In 2017, Storyhunter and UNESCO launched a campaign "We Are the Media" at UNESCO’s World Press Freedom Day conference in Jakarta, Indonesia.

Partnerships
Storyhunter has media partnerships with Yahoo and AOL Storyhunter works with CNN, Time, National Geographic, Group 9 Media, the Weather Channel, Instagram, Bill and Melinda Gates Foundation and Airbnb.

References

External links
Official Website

Video production companies
Mass media companies established in 2012
Internet properties established in 2012
Content management systems
Freelance marketplace websites